Luke McDermott (born September 1, 1987) is an American gold medal ice sled hockey player. He was a member of the gold medal-winning US team in Para ice hockey at the 2018 Winter Paralympics. His disability is an amputation due to an incident when he was a Marine in the Afghan War.

References

External links 
 
 

1987 births
Living people
American amputees
United States Marine Corps personnel of the War in Afghanistan (2001–2021)
American sledge hockey players
Paralympic sledge hockey players of the United States
Paralympic gold medalists for the United States
Para ice hockey players at the 2018 Winter Paralympics
Medalists at the 2018 Winter Paralympics
Ice hockey players from New York (state)
Sportspeople from Albany, New York
Paralympic medalists in sledge hockey